Komal Shahani is an Indian fashion costume designer, who has worked in the Hindi, Tamil, and Telugu film industries for over a decade.

Career 
Komal Shahani began her career as a designer for Mischief Boutique soon after completing her studies. She made her debut as a stylist in the film Koi... Mil Gaya (2003), where she styled Preity Zinta. She styled Neha Dhupia for the Miss Universe pageant and various fashion and Bollywood magazines to establish herself in the fashion industry.<ref name="tamil">{{Cite web|last=சென்|first=சுஜிதா|date=|title=விஜய் வேறலெவல், அக்‌ஷய்குமார் ஸ்பெஷல், ரகுல் ப்ரீத் சிங்குக்கு கஷ்டம்!" - 'மெர்சல்' காஸ்டியூம் டிசைனர்ஸ்|url=https://cinema.vikatan.com/celebrity/115896-costume-designers-interview|url-status=live|archive-url=|archive-date=|access-date=|website=cinema.vikatan.com}}</ref> Komal made her bilingual film debut in the 2011 movie 180 set in Chennai and San Francisco. Later on, she met AR Murugadoss who gave her the opportunity to work in Thuppakki (2012). She has extensively worked with Vijay and has styled him in several films, including Thuppakki, Jilla, Theri, Mersal and Bigil. For Welcome 2 Karachi (2015), Komal sourced embroidered leather Baloch jutis, mirrorwork Muslim caps, headscarves, turbans, and military uniforms of U.S, Indian, and Pakistani personnel for the entire cast. Notably, for Cobra (2022), Komal Shahani designed actor Vikram's seven distinct looks in the film. She has worked on several advertisements featuring Aishwarya Rai Bachchan, Akshay Kumar and for brands such as Lodha, Kurkure and Sting. She has also styled Akshay Kumar for films such as Khiladi 786, Boss and his recent film Selfiee. Komal has currently signed an international project titled Dear Jassi (2023)  with director Tarsem Singh and another with director Balaji Mohan starring Amala Paul.

Personal life
Komal Shahani is married to Hindi film director Ashish R. Mohan. The pair were married in a ceremony in February 2012 attended by several Hindi film personalities.

 Filmography Koi... Mil Gaya Qayamat: City Under ThreatElaan Garam Masala Kyon Ki Chup Chup KeDor AryanRaqeeb DarlingAthidhi My Name is Anthony Gonsalves De Taali Welcome to Sajjanpur One Two Three Toonpur Ka Superhero PowderPaathshaalaAakrosh 180 Bittoo Boss Thuppakki Khiladi 786 Boss Jilla Irumbu Kuthirai Arima Nambi Welcome 2 Karachi Maari Theri Mersal Bigil Cobra Selfiee Dear Jassi Untitled Balaji Mohan movie starring Amala Paul''

Awards and nominations

References

External links

Living people
Indian fashion designers
Indian costume designers
21st-century Indian designers
Indian women fashion designers
Fashion stylists
1981 births